Vitalia Diatchenko was the defending champion but she chose to compete in Nantes instead.

Markéta Vondroušová won the title, defeating Eva Lys in the final, 7–5, 6–2.

Seeds

Draw

Finals

Top half

Bottom half

References

External links
Main Draw

GB Pro-Series Shrewsbury - Singles